Tara Alice Whitten (born 13 July 1980) is a Canadian former racing cyclist.

Career
A former cross-country skier from Edmonton, Alberta, Whitten began track racing seriously in 2008 having dabbled in it since 2005. The same year she won the points race and individual pursuit at the Canadian National Track Championships, and also took the bronze medal in the scratch race and 500 meter time trial events.

Whitten began the 2008–2009 track cycling season strongly, winning two silver medals at first round of the Track World Cup in Manchester, United Kingdom, in October. She went on to take two bronze medals in the third round in Cali, Colombia, and a further two silver medals in the fifth and final round in Copenhagen, Denmark, in February 2009.
 
In March 2009, Whitten won the silver medal in the Omnium at the 2009 UCI Track Cycling World Championships in Pruszków, the first time the event was included in the championships.

In December 2009, Whitten rode on the team that won the gold medal in the 2010 UCI Track Cycling World Cup Classics Women's Team Pursuit in Cali, Colombia, along with fellow Canadian National Team members Laura Brown and Stephanie Roorda, concurrently setting a new Canadian National Record in this event as well with a time of 3:27.289. Of note, the Women's Team Pursuit has been added as an Olympic event for 2012. She also won two silver medals, in the Individual Pursuit (time of 3:34.547) and Points Race.

In March 2010, Whitten won the gold medal in the Omnium and Points race at the 2010 UCI Track Cycling World Championships in Ballerup.

At the 2012 Summer Olympics, she was part of the Canadian team that won the bronze medal in the women's team pursuit. She finished fourth in the omnium.

In March 2016 Whitten was injured in Rio de Janeiro during a visit to inspect the road course for the 2016 Summer Olympics, running her bike into the back of a bus and being knocked unconscious and breaking a bone in the base of her skull. The interruption to her training delayed her qualifying for the Olympics, but she was officially named to Canada's 2016 Olympic team.

Personal life
Whitten was awarded a PhD in neuroscience from the University of Alberta on 10 June 2016, having first earned a science degree in 2006 and been accepted into an electrophysiology lab as a master's student in 2007, while taking periodic breaks from her studies to focus on cycling full-time. She began a post-doctoral fellowship in concussion research at the University of Calgary in fall 2016.

Major results

Track

2008
 National Track Championships
1st  Individual pursuit
1st  Points race
3rd 500m time trial
3rd Scratch
 2008–09 UCI Track Cycling World Cup Classics
2nd  Individual pursuit, Manchester
2nd  Scratch, Manchester
3rd  Individual pursuit, Cali
3rd  Points race, Cali
2009
 2009–10 UCI Track Cycling World Cup Classics, Cali
1st  Team pursuit
2nd  Individual pursuit
2nd  Points race
 2nd  Omnium, UCI Track Cycling World Championships
 2nd  Individual pursuit, 2008–09 UCI Track Cycling World Cup Classics, Copenhagen
2010
 UCI Track Cycling World Championships
1st  Omnium
1st  Points race
 Omnium, 2010–11 UCI Track Cycling World Cup Classics
2nd  Melbourne
2nd  Cali
 Commonwealth Games
3rd  Individual pursuit
3rd  Points race
3rd  Team sprint
 2009–10 UCI Track Cycling World Cup Classics, Beijing
3rd  Individual pursuit
3rd  Team pursuit
2011
 1st  Omnium, UCI Track Cycling World Championships
 1st Overall, Omnium, 2010–11 UCI Track Cycling World Ranking
 2010–11 UCI Track Cycling World Cup Classics, Beijing
1st  Omnium
2nd  Team pursuit
 2nd  Omnium, 2011–12 UCI Track Cycling World Cup, Cali
2012
 2nd  Team pursuit, 2011–12 UCI Track Cycling World Cup, London
 3rd  Team pursuit, Summer Olympics
 3rd  Team pursuit, UCI Track Cycling World Championships

Road

2009
 1st  Time trial, National Road Championships
 8th Time trial, UCI Road World Championships
2010
 Commonwealth Games
1st  Time trial
7th Road race
 National Road Championships
2nd Road race
3rd Time trial
 6th Chrono Gatineau
 7th Time trial, UCI Road World Championships
 9th Grand Prix Cycliste de Gatineau
2011
 2nd Time trial, National Road Championships
 4th Time trial, UCI Road World Championships
 6th Chrono Champenois
2012
 4th Chrono Gatineau
2015
 2nd  Time trial, Pan American Road Championships
 8th Overall Joe Martin Stage Race
 8th Chrono Gatineau
2016
 1st  Time trial, National Road Championships
 1st Overall Cascade Cycling Classic
1st Mountains classification
1st Stages 2 (ITT) & 5
 2nd Chrono Gatineau
 7th Time trial, Summer Olympics

References

External links

1980 births
Living people
Canadian female cyclists
Cyclists at the 2012 Summer Olympics
Cyclists at the 2016 Summer Olympics
Olympic cyclists of Canada
Olympic medalists in cycling
Olympic bronze medalists for Canada
Cyclists at the 2010 Commonwealth Games
Cyclists from Alberta
Medalists at the 2012 Summer Olympics
Sportspeople from Edmonton
UCI Track Cycling World Champions (women)
Commonwealth Games medallists in cycling
Commonwealth Games gold medallists for Canada
Commonwealth Games bronze medallists for Canada
Canadian track cyclists
Medallists at the 2010 Commonwealth Games